Cladh Hallan is an archaeological site on the island of South Uist in the Outer Hebrides in Scotland. It is significant as the only place in Great Britain where prehistoric mummies have been found. Excavations were carried out there between 1988 and 2002, indicating the site was occupied from 2000 BC.

In 2001, a team of archaeologists found four skeletons at the site, one of them a male who had died c. 1600 BC, and another a female who had died c. 1300 BC. (about the same time as King Tutankhamun of Egypt). At first, the researchers did not realise they were dealing with mummies, since the soft tissue had decomposed and the skeletons had been buried. But tests revealed that both bodies had not been buried until about 1120 BC and that the bodies had been preserved shortly after death in a peat bog for 6 to 18 months. The preserved bodies were then apparently retrieved from the bog and set up inside a dwelling, presumably having religious significance. Archaeologists do not know why the bodies were buried centuries later. The Cladh Hallan skeletons differ from most bog bodies in two respects: unlike most bog bodies, they appear to have been put in the bog for the express purpose of preservation (whereas most bog bodies were simply interred in the bog), and unlike most bog bodies, their soft tissue was no longer preserved at the time of discovery.

Analysis 

The skeletons and other finds are being analysed in laboratories in Scotland, England and Wales. Following the provisions of the Treasure Trove Act, all the finds from Cladh Hallan, including the skeletons, will be allocated to a Scottish museum after the lengthy process of analysis and reporting is completed. According to recent anthropological and DNA-analysis the skeletons of a female and a male were compiled from body parts of at least 6 different human individuals.

See also
List of unsolved deaths

References

Further reading

External links 
 
 South Uist, Cladh Hallan Roundhouses Royal Commission on the Ancient and Historical Monuments of Scotland

2001 archaeological discoveries
2001 in science
2001 in Scotland
2nd-millennium BC architecture in Scotland
Archaeological sites in the Outer Hebrides
Archaeology of death
Bog bodies
Bronze Age Scotland
South Uist
Unsolved deaths